Conte Candoli Quartet is an album by trumpeter Conte Candoli recorded in 1957 and originally released on the Mode label.

Reception

The AllMusic review by Scott Yanow noted: " In addition to the joy of hearing Candoli so well-showcased, this set is recommended because of the interesting repertoire".

Track listing 
 "Something for Liza" (Al Cohn) - 4:04
 "Walkie Talkie" (Pete Candoli) - 4:26
 "Flamingo" (Ted Grouya, Edmund Anderson) - 3:13
 "Mediolistic" (Osie Johnson) - 4:21
 "Tara Ferma" (Pete Candoli) - 5:11
 "Diane" (Lew Pollack, Ernö Rapée) - 3:43
 "No Moon at All" (Redd Evans, Dave Mann) - 2:37
 "Mambo Blues" (Conte Candoli) - 3:48

Personnel 
Conte Candoli - trumpet
Vince Guaraldi - piano
Monty Budwig - bass 
Stan Levey - drums

References 

Conte Candoli albums
1957 albums